Italo Pedroncelli (23 November 1935 – 23 December 1992) was an Italian alpine skier. He competed at the 1956, 1960 and the 1964 Winter Olympics.

References

External links
 

1935 births
1992 deaths
Italian male alpine skiers
Olympic alpine skiers of Italy
Alpine skiers at the 1956 Winter Olympics
Alpine skiers at the 1960 Winter Olympics
Alpine skiers at the 1964 Winter Olympics
Sportspeople from the Province of Sondrio
Italian alpine skiing coaches